Ana Rita Contreras Sosa (born July 31, 1984), also known as Dominicana Prestigiosa, is a Dominican beauty pageant titleholder.

She was born in and grew up in  Bayaguana, Monte Plata, Dominican Republic.  In Miss Dominican Republic 2006 she represented the province of Barahona, placing 13th in the preliminaries.  Although she failed to make the top ten, she won the special Miss Communication award.  She represented Monte Plata in Miss Dominican Republic 2009, placing as first runner-up.  When Miss Mundo Dominicana 2009 was cancelled due to lack of funds and sponsors, she was selected to be the representative of the Dominican Republic at Miss World 2009, where she did not place.

Contreras is a summa cum laude graduate with honors in Architecture from the Universidad Iberoamericana de Santo Domingo, and a graduate of the modeling academy "The Femme Elegant".  She studied for her master's degree at Columbia University of New York City.

See also
Miss Dominican Republic 2009
Miss Mundo Dominicana 2009
Miss Dominican Republic 2006

References 

1984 births
Living people
People from Monte Plata Province
Dominican Republic beauty pageant winners
Miss Dominican Republic
Miss World 2009 delegates
Columbia Graduate School of Architecture, Planning and Preservation alumni